Brigman is a surname. Notable people with the surname include:

Anne Brigman (1869–1950), American photographer
D. J. Brigman (born 1976), American golfer
June Brigman (born 1960), American comics artist and illustrator
Megan Brigman (b. 1990), American soccer player

Surnames of Old English origin
Germanic-language surnames
Surnames of English origin